The following is a list of mayors of the city of Belém, Pará state, Brazil.

 , 1891-1894
 Antonio Joaquim da Silva Rosado, 1894-1897
 , 1897-1911 
 Henrique Sabino da Luz, 1911-1912
 Virgílio Martins Lopes Mendonça, 1912-1913
 , 1913-1914
 Antônio Martins Pinheiro, 1914-1921	
 Antônio José Ó de Almeida, 1921	
 Cipriano José dos Santos, 1921-1922	
 Sabino Silva, 1922-1923	   
 José Olímpio Barroso Rebêllo, 1923-1924	
 Manoel Waldomiro Rodrigues dos Santos, 1924-1926	 
 Antônio Crespo de Castro, 1926-1928	   
 José Maria Camisão, 1928-1929	   
 , 1929-1930	  
 , 1930, 1933-1934	
 Leandro Pinheiro, 1930-1932	
 Abelardo Condurú, 1932-1933, 1936-1943 
 Ildefonso Almeida, 1934-1935	
 Ismael de Castro, 1935	
 Venerando de Freitas Borges, 1935-1936	
 Jerônimo Cavalcante, 1943	
 Emauel Ó de Almeida Morais, 1943	
 , 1943-1945	
 Augusto Serra, 1945-1946	
 Euclides Cumaru, 1946	
 Manoel Figueiredo, 1946-1947	
 Teivelindo Guapindaia, 1947	
 Estórgio Meira Lima, 1947-1950
 , 1950-1951
 Rodolfo da Silva Santos Chermont, 1951	  
 Lopo Alvarez de Castro, 1951-1953, 1957-1961 
 Celso Cunha da Gama Malcher, 1953-1957	
 Luiz Geolás de Moura Carvalho, 1961-1964
 Alacid Nunes, 1964-1965 
 Osvaldo Sampaio Melo, 1965-1966	   
 , 1966-1970	   
 Mauro Fernando Pilar Porto, 1970-1971	   
 Nélio Dacier Lobato, 1971-1974	   
 Octávio Bandeira Cascaes, 1974-1975	   
 Ajáx Carvalho de Oliveira, 1975-1978	   
 Luiz Felipe Machado de Sant'Ana, 1978-1980	
 Lorewal Rei de Magalhães, 1980-1983	   
 , 1983, 1989-1990	   
 , 1983-1985	   
 , 1986-1988
 , 1990-1992 	
 Hélio Gueiros, 1993-1996
 Edmilson Rodrigues, 1997-2004	
 , 2005-2012	
 , 2013-2021
 Edmilson Rodrigues 2021-

See also
  (city hall), in the  bairro
 Timeline of Belém
 List of mayors of largest cities in Brazil (in Portuguese)
 List of mayors of capitals of Brazil (in Portuguese)

References

This article incorporates information from the Portuguese Wikipedia.

belem